Football Club Hoverla Uzhhorod was a Ukrainian professional football club based in Uzhhorod. Following the end of the 2015–16 season it was expelled from the Ukrainian Premier League because of debts to (current and former) players. It then ceased to exist.

History

The club was inaugurated in 1946 as Spartak Uzhhorod. However some of its emblems point to a predecessor, SC Rus, founded in 1925, although direct links between the two franchises can barely be traced. In 1961, Spartak was renamed Verhovyna, and in 1971 Hoverla. In 1982, it was renamed Zakarpattia, then Verhovyna again in 1997 for two years.

Zakarpattia started the 2001–02 season in the Ukrainian Premier League, but a last-place finish saw the club demoted to the Ukrainian First League. They returned in 2004–05 and 2007–08 but each time with the same result: relegation from the Premier League after a single season.

Before the start of the 2011–12 Ukrainian First League season the club renamed itself FC Hoverla-Zakarpattia Uzhhorod.

The team renamed themselves Hoverla prior to the start of the 2012–13 Ukrainian Premier League season. Following the season the club was supposed to be relegated according to the season's regulations, yet conveniently both runners-up PFC Oleksandriya and FC Stal Alchevsk refused to get promoted, while the Football Federation of Ukraine refused other teams to get promoted.

On 8 June 2016, (after the end of the 2015–16 season) the club did not get a licence to continue to play in the league due to debts to (current and former) players and was thus de facto expelled from the Ukrainian Premier League. It then ceased to exist.

Name changes
  1946 – Spartak
  1961 – Verkhovyna
  1971 – Hoverla
 /  1982 – Zakarpattia
  1997 – Verkhovyna
  1999 – Zakarpattia
  2011 – Hoverla-Zakarpattia
  2012 – Hoverla

Football kits and sponsors

Honors
Ukrainian First League
Winners (3): 2003–04, 2008–09, 2011–12
Runners-up (2): 2001–02, 2006–07
Ukrainian Second League
Winners (1): 1998–99 (Group A)

In Soviet Union
 Football Championship of the Ukrainian SSR
 Winners (3): 1946, 1950, 1953
 Runners-up (1): 1972
 Cup of the Ukrainian SSR
 Winners (1): 1950

League and cup history

{|class="wikitable"
|-bgcolor="#efefef"
! Season
! Div.
! Pos.
! Pl.
! W
! D
! L
! GS
! GA
! P
!Domestic Cup
!colspan=2|Europe
!Notes
|-bgcolor=LightCyan
|align=center|1992
|align=center|2nd "B"
|align=center|5
|align=center|26
|align=center|13
|align=center|5
|align=center|8
|align=center|28
|align=center|25
|align=center|31
|align=center|1/32 finals
|align=center|
|align=center|
|align=center|
|-bgcolor=LightCyan
|align=center|1992–93
|align=center|2nd
|align=center|16
|align=center|42
|align=center|13
|align=center|10
|align=center|19
|align=center|45
|align=center|56
|align=center|36
|align=center|1/64 finals
|align=center|
|align=center|
|align=center|
|-bgcolor=LightCyan
|align=center|1993–94
|align=center|2nd
|align=center|14
|align=center|38
|align=center|12
|align=center|8
|align=center|18
|align=center|33
|align=center|53
|align=center|32
|align=center|1/32 finals
|align=center|
|align=center|
|align=center|
|-bgcolor=LightCyan
|align=center|1994–95
|align=center|2nd
|align=center|17
|align=center|38
|align=center|12
|align=center|10
|align=center|20
|align=center|40
|align=center|62
|align=center|46
|align=center|1/16 finals
|align=center|
|align=center|
|align=center|
|-bgcolor=LightCyan
|align=center|1995–96
|align=center|2nd
|align=center|17
|align=center|42
|align=center|14
|align=center|8
|align=center|20
|align=center|49
|align=center|67
|align=center|50
|align=center|1/32 finals
|align=center|
|align=center|
|align=center|
|-bgcolor=LightCyan
|align=center|1996–97
|align=center|2nd
|align=center|15
|align=center|46
|align=center|17
|align=center|7
|align=center|22
|align=center|56
|align=center|78
|align=center|58
|align=center|1/32 finals 1st Stage
|align=center|
|align=center|
|align=center|as Verhovyna
|-bgcolor=LightCyan
|align=center|1997–98
|align=center|2nd
|align=center|20
|align=center|42
|align=center|7
|align=center|11
|align=center|24
|align=center|42
|align=center|79
|align=center|32
|align=center|1/32 finals
|align=center|
|align=center|
|align=center bgcolor=red|Relegatedas Verhovyna
|-bgcolor=PowderBlue
|align=center|1998–99
|align=center|3rd "A"
|align=center bgcolor=gold|1
|align=center|28
|align=center|20
|align=center|6
|align=center|2
|align=center|48
|align=center|14
|align=center|66
|align=center|1/64 finals
|align=center|
|align=center|
|align=center bgcolor=green|Promoted
|-bgcolor=LightCyan
|align=center|1999–00
|align=center|2nd
|align=center|13
|align=center|34
|align=center|14
|align=center|6
|align=center|14
|align=center|36
|align=center|49
|align=center|48
|align=center|1/16 finals
|align=center|
|align=center|
|align=center|
|-bgcolor=LightCyan
|align=center|2000–01
|align=center|2nd
|align=center bgcolor=silver|2
|align=center|34
|align=center|19
|align=center|7
|align=center|8
|align=center|50
|align=center|38
|align=center|64
|align=center|1/8 finals
|align=center|
|align=center|
|align=center bgcolor=green|Promoted
|-
|align=center|2001–02
|align=center|1st
|align=center|14
|align=center|26
|align=center|5
|align=center|6
|align=center|15
|align=center|23
|align=center|49
|align=center|21
|align=center|1/4 finals
|align=center|
|align=center|
|align=center bgcolor=red|Relegated
|-bgcolor=LightCyan
|align=center|2002–03
|align=center|2nd
|align=center|7
|align=center|34
|align=center|14
|align=center|9
|align=center|11
|align=center|27
|align=center|26
|align=center|51
|align=center|1/16 finals
|align=center|
|align=center|
|align=center|
|-bgcolor=LightCyan
|align=center|2003–04
|align=center|2nd
|align=center bgcolor=gold|1
|align=center|34
|align=center|22
|align=center|4
|align=center|8
|align=center|49
|align=center|27
|align=center|70
|align=center|1/16 finals
|align=center|
|align=center|
|align=center bgcolor=green|Promoted
|-
|align=center|2004–05
|align=center|1st
|align=center|12
|align=center|30
|align=center|7
|align=center|10
|align=center|13
|align=center|21
|align=center|30
|align=center|31
|align=center|1/32 finals
|align=center|
|align=center|
|align=center|
|-
|align=center|2005–06
|align=center|1st
|align=center|16
|align=center|30
|align=center|3
|align=center|6
|align=center|21
|align=center|17
|align=center|53
|align=center|15
|align=center|1/16 finals
|align=center|
|align=center|
|align=center bgcolor=red|Relegated
|-bgcolor=LightCyan
|align=center|2006–07
|align=center|2nd
|align=center bgcolor=silver|2
|align=center|36
|align=center|25
|align=center|5
|align=center|6
|align=center|50
|align=center|22
|align=center|80
|align=center|1/16 finals
|align=center|
|align=center|
|align=center bgcolor=green|Promoted
|-
|align=center|2007–08
|align=center|1st
|align=center|16
|align=center|30
|align=center|3
|align=center|9
|align=center|18
|align=center|17
|align=center|54
|align=center|18
|align=center|1/16 finals
|align=center|
|align=center|
|align=center bgcolor=red|Relegated
|-bgcolor=LightCyan
|align=center|2008–09
|align=center|2nd
|align=center bgcolor=gold|1
|align=center|32
|align=center|21
|align=center|6
|align=center|5
|align=center|55
|align=center|28
|align=center|69
|align=center|1/8 finals
|align=center|
|align=center|
|align=center bgcolor=green|Promoted
|-
|align=center|2009–10
|align=center|1st
|align=center|16
|align=center|30
|align=center|5
|align=center|4
|align=center|21
|align=center|18
|align=center|44
|align=center|19
|align=center|1/16 finals
|align=center|
|align=center|
|align=center bgcolor=red|Relegated
|-bgcolor=LightCyan
|align=center|2010–11
|align=center|2nd
|align=center|6
|align=center|34
|align=center|16
|align=center|8
|align=center|10
|align=center|51
|align=center|40
|align=center|56
|align=center|1/32 finals
|align=center|
|align=center|
|align=center|
|-bgcolor=LightCyan
|align=center|2011–12
|align=center|2nd
|align=center bgcolor=gold|1
|align=center|34
|align=center|27
|align=center|3
|align=center|4
|align=center|67
|align=center|16
|align=center|84
|align=center|1/16 finals
|align=center|
|align=center|
|align=center bgcolor=green|Promoted
|-
|align=center|2012–13
|align=center|1st
|align=center|15
|align=center|30
|align=center|5
|align=center|7
|align=center|18
|align=center|29
|align=center|57
|align=center|22
|align=center|1/8 finals
|align=center|
|align=center|
|align=center|
|-
|align=center|2013–14
|align=center|1st
|align=center|12
|align=center|28
|align=center| 7
|align=center|5
|align=center|16
|align=center|26
|align=center|39
|align=center|26
|align=center|1/16 finals
|align=center|
|align=center|
|align=center|
|-
| align="center" |2014–15
| align="center" |1st
| align="center" |12
| align="center" |26
| align="center" |3
| align="center" |10
| align="center" |13
| align="center" |22
| align="center" |47
| align="center" |19
|align=center|1/8 finals
| align="center" |
| align="center" |
| align="center" |
|-
| align="center" |2015–16
| align="center" |1st
| align="center" |13
| align="center" | 26 	
| align="center" |3 	
| align="center" |7 	
| align="center" |16 	
| align="center" |13 	
| align="center" |45 	
| align="center" |7       
| align="center" |1/16 finals
| align="center" |
| align="center" |
| align="center" |−9
|}
In their last season the club was deducted nine points due to not complying with decisions of the FFU Control and Disciplinary Committee (CDC).

Managers

USSR
 Bertalon Veyg (1946–47)
 Fedir Kuruts & Bertalon Veig (1948–49)
 Vasyl Radyk & Ferents Kuruts (1950–51)
 Vasyl Radyk (1952)
 Bertalon Veyg & Vasyl Radyk (1953)
 Karoy Sabo & Ferenc Kuruc (1954–55)
 Mykhaylo Mykhalyna (1956–59)
 Mykhaylo Mykhalyna & Ernest Yust (1960–61)
 Mykhaylo Mykhalyna (1963–68)
 Vasyl Revachko & Zoltan Dyerfi (1969–70)
 Vasyl Turyanchyk (1971)
 Dezyderiy Tovt & Ivan Pazho (1972–73)
 Mykhaylo Mykhalyna (1975)
 Ishtvan Shandor (197x–78)
 Ernest Kesler (1979–8?)
 Ishtvan Shandor (1984–87)
 Ivan Pazho (1987–88)
 Ivan Krasnetskyi (1989–90)

Ukraine
  Stepan Voytko (1990–92)
 Yuriy Chirkov (1992–93)
 Ivan Shanhin (1993–94)
 Ernest Kesler (1994)
 Ivan Ledney (1994)
 Yuriy Chirkov (1995)
 Matviy Bobal (1995–96)
 Oleksandr Holokolosov (1997)
 Stepan Voytko (1997)
 Ivan Shanhin (1997–98)
 Valentyn Khodukin (1998)
 Viktor Ryashko (1998–2000)
 Yuriy Kalitvintsev (1 July 2001 – 30 June 2002)
 Viktor Ryashko (2002–22 Aug 2005)
 Petro Kushlyk (Sept 7, 2005 – Sept 28, 2007)
 Volodymyr Sharan (Sept 28, 2007–21 April 2008)
 Mykhaylo Ivanytsya (21 April 2008 – 30 June 2009)
  Igor Gamula (1 July 2009 – 5 April 2011)
 Oleksandr Sevidov (7 April 2011 – 26 May 2013)
 Vyacheslav Hroznyi (18 June 2013 – May 2016)

Famous players
 David Odonkor

See also
 FC Uzhhorod

References

External links
Official website

 
Football clubs in Zakarpattia Oblast
Association football clubs established in 1925
Association football clubs disestablished in 2016
Football clubs in the Ukrainian Soviet Socialist Republic
Sport in Uzhhorod
Defunct football clubs in Ukraine
1925 establishments in Czechoslovakia
2016 disestablishments in Ukraine